Thiratoscirtus is a genus of jumping spiders that was first described by Eugène Louis Simon in 1886.

Species
 it contains twenty-six species, found only in Africa, Argentina, and Brazil:
Thiratoscirtus alveolus Wesolowska & Russell-Smith, 2011 – Nigeria
Thiratoscirtus atakpa Wesolowska & Edwards, 2012 – Nigeria
Thiratoscirtus bipaniculus Wesolowska & Russell-Smith, 2011 – Nigeria
Thiratoscirtus capito Simon, 1903 – West Africa, Equatorial Guinea (Bioko)
Thiratoscirtus cinctus (Thorell, 1899) – Cameroon
Thiratoscirtus efik Wesolowska & Edwards, 2012 – Nigeria
Thiratoscirtus elgonensis Dawidowicz & Wesolowska, 2016 – Kenya
Thiratoscirtus fuscorufescens Strand, 1906 – Cameroon
Thiratoscirtus gambari Wesolowska & Russell-Smith, 2011 – Nigeria
Thiratoscirtus harpago Wesolowska & Russell-Smith, 2011 – Nigeria
Thiratoscirtus lamboji Seiter & Wesolowska, 2015 – Gabon
Thiratoscirtus mastigophorus Wiśniewski & Wesolowska, 2013 – Congo
Thiratoscirtus minimus Dawidowicz & Wesolowska, 2016 – Kenya
Thiratoscirtus mirabilis Wesolowska & Russell-Smith, 2011 – Nigeria
Thiratoscirtus monstrum Wesolowska & Russell-Smith, 2011 – Nigeria
Thiratoscirtus niveimanus Simon, 1886 – Brazil
Thiratoscirtus oberleuthneri Seiter & Wesolowska, 2015 – Gabon
Thiratoscirtus obudu Wesolowska & Russell-Smith, 2011 – Nigeria
Thiratoscirtus patagonicus Simon, 1886 (type) – Argentina
Thiratoscirtus perspicuus Wiśniewski & Wesolowska, 2013 – Ivory Coast, Congo
Thiratoscirtus procerus Wesolowska & Edwards, 2012 – Nigeria
Thiratoscirtus remyi (Berland & Millot, 1941) – Guinea
Thiratoscirtus torquatus Simon, 1903 – West Africa
Thiratoscirtus versicolor Simon, 1902 – Sierra Leone
Thiratoscirtus vilis Wesolowska & Russell-Smith, 2011 – Nigeria
Thiratoscirtus yorubanus Wesolowska & Russell-Smith, 2011 – Nigeria

References

Further reading
Survey of the Genus Thiratoscirtus

Salticidae genera
Salticidae
Spiders of Africa
Spiders of Argentina
Spiders of Brazil